Yednovo is a rural locality (a village) in Shemogodskoye Velikoustyugsky District, Vologda Oblast, Russia. The population was 10 as of 2002.

Geography 
Yednovo is located 31 km northeast of Veliky Ustyug (the district's administrative centre) by road. Balagurovo is the nearest rural locality.

References 

Rural localities in Velikoustyugsky District